Events in the year 2017 in Eswatini.

Incumbents
Monarch (Ngwenyama): Mswati III
Prime Minister: Barnabas Sibusiso Dlamini

Events

Deaths
7 February – Sotsha Dlamini, politician (b. 1940).

References

 
2010s in Eswatini
Years of the 21st century in Eswatini
Eswatini
Eswatini